Hervé Novelli (born 6 March 1949 in Paris) is a French politician of Italian origin, and a past member of the UDF group. He was a deputé in the Assemblée Nationale for the Indre-et-Loire département from 2002 to 2007, having previously been a député from 1993–1997.  He has also served as a member of the European Parliament from 1999 to 2002 and as vice-president of the Indre et Loire local government (conseil général) from 1998 to 2001. He is also mayor of Richelieu since 2001. In June 2007, he became a member of the cabinet of Nicolas Sarkozy as an undersecretary for business and foreign trade (secrétaire d’Etat chargé des Entreprises et du Commerce extérieur). He was from March 2008 to 13 November 2010 an undersecretary for commerce, craftsmanship, small and medium businesses, tourism and services (secrétaire d’Etat chargé du commerce, de l’artisanat, des petites et moyennes entreprises, du tourisme et des services) in the cabinet of Nicolas Sarkozy. In March 2006, he has created the association Les Réformateurs.

His political history is that of a conservative politician moving to the center ground. He was, from the 1960s to 1980s a member of various extreme right parties including Occident, the Parti des forces nouvelles, the National Front, etc., before joining the conservative National Centre of Independents and Peasants and then the centrist Parti Républicain, a component of UDF. He was general secretary from 1990 to 1993, then member of the  bureau exécutif of the Parti Républicain.

Professionally, he was CEO of établissements Janton, from 1982 to 2006, and chargé de mission for the French steel industry (Chargé de mission pour la chambre syndicale de la sidérurgie française)
from 1977 to 1986.

Political career

Governmental functions

Secretary of State for Trade, Crafts, Small and Medium Enterprises, Tourism, Services and Consumer : 2009–2010.

Secretary of State for Business and Foreign Trade : 2007–2009.

Electoral mandates

European Parliament

Member of European Parliament : 1999–2002 (Resignation, reelected in the National Assembly in 2002).

National Assembly of France

Member of the National Assembly of France for Indre-et-Loire (4th constituency) : 1993–1997 / 2002–2007 (Became secretary of State in 2007) / 2010–2012 (He losts his reelection). Elected in 1993, reelected in 2002, 2007.

Regional Council

Regional councillor of Centre (région) : 2004–2007 (Resignation) / Since 2010. Reelected in 2010.

General Council

Vice-president of the General Council of Indre-et-Loire : 1998–2001 (Resignation).

General councillor of Indre-et-Loire : 1997–2001 (Resignation).

Municipal Council

Mayor of Richelieu, Indre-et-Loire : Since 2008.

Deputy-mayor of Richelieu, Indre-et-Loire : 2001–2008.

Municipal councillor of Richelieu, Indre-et-Loire : Since 2001. Reelected in 2008.

Municipal councillor of Joué-lès-Tours : 1995–2001.

Community of communes Council

President of Communauté de communes du pays de Richelieu : Since 2001. Reelected in 2008.

Member of Communauté de communes du pays de Richelieu : Since 2001. Reelected in 2008.

Bibliography 
 Frédéric Charpier, Génération Occident (Paris: Le Seuil, 2005)

External links 
 Web site of Hervé Novelli (in French)
 Hervé Novelli's page at Assemblée Nationale (in French)
 Biography on the Web site of the French Government

1949 births
Living people
Politicians from Paris
French people of Italian descent
National Rally (France) politicians
Party of New Forces politicians
National Centre of Independents and Peasants politicians
Union for French Democracy politicians
Republican Party (France) politicians
Liberal Democracy (France) politicians
Union for a Popular Movement politicians
MEPs for France 1999–2004
Republican Party (France) MEPs
Paris Dauphine University alumni
Deputies of the 12th National Assembly of the French Fifth Republic
Deputies of the 13th National Assembly of the French Fifth Republic